T is the twentieth letter of the Latin alphabet. (For the same letterform in the Cyrillic and Greek alphabets, see Te and Tau respectively).

T may also refer to:

Codes and units 
 T, Tera- as in one trillion
 T, the symbol for "True" in logic
 T, the usual symbol for period, the reciprocal of frequency
 T, the symbol for Tesla, the SI unit of magnetic field
 t, the SI symbol for tonne or metric ton
 t, the usual symbol for time 
 t, the angular coordinate of the polar coordinate system (usually ϕ or θ) is sometimes denoted by t
 , the symbol for torque
 ⊤, the top element of a partially ordered set
 T, short for tablespoon
 t, short for teaspoon

Names
 Titus (praenomen), common name throughout Roman history, regularly abbreviated T

Entertainment

Literature 
 T (New York Times), a fashion magazine
 T, a novel by Victor Pelevin
 T-unit, a grammatical term
 "T" Is for Trespass, the twentieth novel in Sue Grafton's "Alphabet mystery" series, published in 2007

Television 
 Mr. T (b. 1952), American television actor
T, the production code for the 1965 Doctor Who serial Galaxy 4
 The T logo for the American Spanish-language network Telemundo

Music 
 T (Funker Vogt album), a 2000 aggrotech album by Funker Vogt
 T (TVXQ album), a 2008 TVXQ album
 T (Teflon Brothers album), a 2009 album by Finnish hip hop group Teflon Brothers
 "t," an Iamamiwhoami song
 T, abbreviation for tutti
 T, abbreviation for tenor
 t, note abbreviation in tonic sol-fa for seventh scale degree
 T-Babe, a virtual pop singer

Video games
 T (teen), a game rating from the Entertainment Software Rating Board which the board believes is suitable for those aged 13 years and older

Finance and business 
 AT&T, an American phone company which trades on the New York Stock Exchange as T
 T-Mobile, mobile network operator based in Germany
 T-Online, German Internet Service Provider
 Treasury (as in T-Bill, T-Bond, T-Note)
 T, a mintmark for Nantes, France
 The AT&T Center in San Antonio, Texas, United States

Science

Biology and medicine 
 Troponin T, one of the three troponins
 Haplogroup T (mtDNA), a human mitochondrial DNA (mtDNA) haplogroup
 T cells, part of the components of the immune system along with B cells
 T, the one-letter code used for threonine, one of the 20 amino acids used in transcription of a polypeptide chain
 Thymine, one of the four nucleic acids of DNA
 T, gene and protein symbol for the transcription factor brachyury
 Thoracic vertebrae T-1 through T-12
 T wave, the repolarization wave of cardiac ventricles in electrocardiography
 T, a common abbreviation for the male sex hormone testosterone

Palaeontology 
 T-rex, abbreviation for Tyrannosaurus rex

Meteorology 
 Thunderstorm
 T-number in the Dvorak technique, a way to rate storm intensity

Physics and chemistry 
 T, symbol for tritium, a radioactive isotope of hydrogen
 T-symmetry in particle physics
 Class T, a cool brown dwarf class of stars
 ΔT (disambiguation): a variety of meanings related to changes in a quantity denoted by T, such as time or temperature

Mathematics 
 T score, a statistical term
 Student's t-distribution, statistical term
 System T, in modal logic
 , the n-dimensional torus
 , the Circle group
AT, the transpose of a matrix A

Technology and computing 
 T (programming language), created in the early 1980s
 T, Toshiba's mobile phones in Japan
 T, an abbreviation for telephone number
 t, an abbreviation for microblogging service Twitter
 t-distributed stochastic neighbor embedding, a machine learning algorithm for data visualization
 T-pose,  a default pose for a 3D model's skeleton before it is animated
 Landing T, a ground signal that indicates the wind direction in aerodromes
 Transfer (computing), in computer technology, a data transfer, often used to measure speed (e.g. megatransfers per second)

Transportation

Equipment 
 Ford Model T, produced 1908–1927
 NZR T class steam locomotives in New Zealand
 Tank locomotive
 OS T1000, an Oslo Metro train
 T gauge, a scale for model railroad trains

Public transport 
 Massachusetts Bay Transportation Authority (nicknamed the "T")
 T Third Street in San Francisco, California 
 Oslo Metro or 
 Pittsburgh Light Rail, commonly called the T
 Stockholm Metro or T-bana
 T (New York City Subway service)
 Trinity Metro, formerly known as "The T"

Phonetics 
 [t], the International Phonetic Alphabet character for the voiceless alveolar plosive
 [ʈ], the IPA character representing the voiceless retroflex stop

Other uses 
 "The T", a nickname for the rural part of Pennsylvania due to its shape when eliminating the Pittsburgh and Philadelphia Metropolitan Areas, also known by its slang term Pennsyltucky
 Т, a letter of the Cyrillic alphabet
 T-bone steak, the cut of meat
 T-shirt, a type of clothing
 T in the Park, an annual music festival, held in Kinross, Scotland and named after its main sponsor, the brewing company Tennents
 Crossing the T, a classic naval warfare tactic
 Stealing the 'T', an historic college prank as the "T" is stolen from the Tech Tower at the Georgia Institute of Technology
 T (Tango), the military time zone code for UTC−07:00

See also 
 T class (disambiguation)
 Class T (disambiguation)
 T-type (disambiguation)